Boron porphyrins are a variety of porphyrin, a common macrocycle used for photosensitization and metal trapping applications, that incorporate boron. The central four nitrogen atoms in a porphyrin macrocycle form a unique molecular pocket which is known to accommodate transition metals of various sizes and oxidation states. Due to the diversity of binding modes available to porphyrin, there is a growing interest in introducing other elements (i.e. main group elements) into this pocket.

Boron in particular has been shown to prefer binding to porphyrin in a 2:1 stoichiometry, primarily due to its small atomic radius, but the Group XIII element will bind in a 1:1 ratio with corrole, a macromolecule with a structure similar to porphyrin but with a smaller N4 pocket.

Boron porphyrins are of interest because of the unique geometric environment to which both boron and porphyrin are subjected upon B-N(pyrrole)  bond formation. These new geometric motifs lead to novel reactivity, one of the most surprising examples being sterically-induced reductive coupling. Possible applications for boron porphyrins include BNCT delivery agents and OLED devices.

Also of interest are molecules containing both boron and porphyrin moieties, but without B-N(pyrrole) bonds. Examples include diketonate-porphyrin compounds and dyads (two-component molecules) containing the classic BODIPY dye.

Synthesis 
Boron porphyrins first appeared in the literature during the 1960's and 1970's, in initially available literature the complex was never well characterized. The Boron porphyrin compounds can be synthesized either from the free base porphyrin or from a lithium porphyrin complex as starting material. Two representative examples are shown here. The first is the porphyrin free base reacted with BX3 in the presence of water.

The second is Li2(ttp) reacted with BX3. The (BX2)2(por) can undergo reduction to form a B-B bond and eliminate X2, giving (BX)2(por). From here, the halides can be replaced with BuLi to give (B-Bu)2(por), reacted with alcohols to give (B-OR)2(por), or even undergo halogen abstraction via weakly-coordinating anions to give [(B-B)(por)]2+.

Geometry 
One of the major differences between p-block-element-centered porphyrins and transition-metal-centered porphyrins is the far smaller size of the interstitial atom, especially in the case of the first-row p-block. Other than protons, the next smallest atom known to bind to the central N4 pocket is lithium. The first two isolated lithium porphyrin complexes each reported a 2:1 metal to base ratio, and XRD suggested both lithium atoms reside out of the porphyrin plane. 

Boron has a covalent radius of 85 pm, significantly smaller than lithium's 133 pm. This suggests the porphyrin pocket is more likely to accommodate two boron atoms rather than one. Indeed, each boron porphyrin synthesized thus far has adopted a ratio of 2:1, with a range of orientations relative to the N4 plane. The boron atoms can exist in the same plane as the porphyrin (both with and without additional out-of-plane B-X bonds), or out of N4 plane in either a cisoid or transoid geometry.

This coordination motif is interesting because it introduces both boron and porphyrin to geometries they do not regularly adopt. Porphyrin readily binds to transition metals, which are capable of octahedral or square planar geometries. Boron, without available d-orbitals, typically adopts a trigonal planar or tetrahedral local bonding environment. Diboryl porphyrins,  on the other hand, find boron in a pseudo-tetrahedral local environment and introduce a tetragonal distortion to the porphyrin, as can be seen in the DFT image above.

Corroles are distinct from porphyrins in that they contain one less methine to bridge between pyrrole units, creating a lower-symmetry compound and a smaller N4 pocket. For boron chemistry, this slightly smaller core allows for the possibility of binding to a single boron, whereas the porphyrin pocket has thus far always bound two. For such monoboryl corroles, DFT studies have suggested the boron preferentially binds to the dipyrromethene (A) site shown here, in which stability is attained by maximizing both BX—HN hydrogen bonding and BH—HN dihydrogen bonding, in addition to minimizing steric crowding.

The Brothers group has shown the stereochemical implications of comparing diboryl porphyrin with diboryl corrole: porphyrin prefers transoid orientation of the diboryl unit, whereas corrole prefers the cisoid orientation.

Non-central boron-porphyrin interactions 
Two examples of boron-containing compounds that have been linked to porphyrin are BODIPY and diketonate.

The BODIPY chromophore acts as an antenna: it absorbs a broad range of UV-visible light, then emits at a wavelength compatible with porphyrin absorption, allowing for efficient energy transfer.

This work has been extended to triads and to porphyrins with various core transition metals, some displaying multiphoton excitation.

On the other hand, when boron difluoride β-diketonate is used for an antenna, the emission-absorption overlap is small and little change in the porphyrin's optical properties is observed. Though this chromophore is preferable to BODIPY in certain applications, it is not an effective antenna for porphyrin.

Reactivity

Reduction 
One consequence of geometric strain on both the boron and the porphyrin moieties is unique reactivity. The Brothers group was able to demonstrate reductive coupling, wherein two BX2 units inside the porphyrin pocket become X-B-B-X, only occurs with X=Br and when the substrates are within the porphyrin pocket. DFT calculations show that for X=Cl or F, the reaction is endothermic and non-spontaneous. However, for X=Br, the reduction is spontaneous, which was consistent with experimental findings. Further, when the same reaction is simulated with two porphyrin halves ((dipyrromethene)BX2), it is non-spontaneous even for X=Br, suggesting the steric strain of the porphyrin ring to be the driving force behind the reduction reaction.

Hydrolysis 

Hydrolysis is one of the primary reactions to occur in diboryl porphyrin complexes. In this reaction, RBOBR(por) reacts with water to exchange a B-OH bond for a B-R bond, liberating the R group.

Hydrolysis products are important intermediates in the synthesis of the B-O-B(por) compounds from BX2(por) compounds. In fact, simply performing column chromatography on (BF2)2(por) on silica gives the partial hydrolysis product B2OF2(por).

DFT computations show that hydrolysis, as in the scheme shown here, is energetically favorable (breaking of a relatively weak B-C bond, formation of a strong B-O bond, formation of benzene). However, only one of the two phenyl groups is observed to undergo hydrolysis. This suggests thermodynamic favorability is not the only factor at play. Rather, as Belcher et al. suggest, there is a significant steric component to this reaction. The boron in the porphyrin ring plane undergoes substitution, while the out-of-plane boron retains its phenyl bond.

Halogen Abstraction 
(Also see Geometry section above for a discussion of the B-B bonding environment.)

Abstraction of halogens with two equivalents of sodium tetrakis[3,5-bis(trifluoromethyl)phenyl]borate gives the dication with both boron atoms within the porphyrin plane. Two reversible reduction waves occur at reduction potentials lower than that of the free base.

References 

Boron compounds
Photochemistry
Porphyrins
Boron–nitrogen compounds